This is a list of governors of the Austrian state of Carinthia:

Austro-Hungarian Empire (1861–1918)
Presidents of the province of Carinthia, assisted by Provincial Governors

Austria

List
Carinthia
Governors